Stéphanie Kochert (born 12 August 1975) is a French politician of LREM who has been Member of Parliament for Bas-Rhin's 8th constituency in the National Assembly since 2022.

See also 

 List of deputies of the 16th National Assembly of France

References 

Living people
1975 births
21st-century French politicians
21st-century French women politicians
Horizons politicians

Deputies of the 16th National Assembly of the French Fifth Republic
Women members of the National Assembly (France)
Members of Parliament for Bas-Rhin